Persikabo Stadium or Tegar Beriman Stadium is a multi-use stadium in Cibinong, Bogor, Indonesia. It is currently used training stadium of Persikabo Bogor. The stadium holds 15,000 people.

Tournament

References 

 

Sports venues in Indonesia
Football venues in Indonesia
Multi-purpose stadiums in Indonesia
Stadiums under construction
Buildings and structures in West Java